Jack Tripper is a fictional character on the sitcom Three's Company, based upon the character Robin Tripp from Man About the House created by Brian Cooke and Johnnie Mortimer. Jack was played by the actor John Ritter.

Introduction
Janet reasoned with the landlord, Stanley Roper, who lived downstairs, and he agreed that Jack could stay because Janet told Mr. Roper that Jack was gay, without Jack's knowledge. Jack was, however, actually straight (the comedy stemming from having to "play gay" provided much of the story for the sitcom). 
Jack is something of a ladies' man, but is also kind-hearted, loyal and protective of the girls.

Jobs
Jack attended a local technical college on the G.I. Bill for a degree in culinary arts and held down odd jobs in his spare time.

References

External links
 
 Jack's Bistro

Fictional chefs
Fictional impostors
Fictional navy personnel
Television characters introduced in 1977
Three's Company